The Pizhma is a river in Nizhny Novgorod and Kirov Oblasts in Russia, a tributary of the Vyatka. The length of the river is 305 km, the area of its basin is 15,000 km². The Pizhma freezes up in mid-November and stays icebound until the second half of April. The Pizhma is navigable within 144 km of its estuary. The Nemda is a right tributary of the Pizhma.

References

Rivers of Kirov Oblast
Rivers of Nizhny Novgorod Oblast